Shroff is a surname. 

The word is derived from the Hindustani word saraf (bullion merchant , Baniya), which in turn, is ultimately derived from the Arabic ṣarrāf. The word is also used to mean a cashier, especially in a car park or identity card, car licensing offices and public service agents in East Asia, and a money changer or banker in South Asia. In Hong Kong a shroff may be a place to conduct payments. In 2016 the word "shroff" became a part of the Oxford English Dictionary.

List of people with surname Shroff
Anaita Shroff Adajania (born 1972), Indian fashion stylist
Anish Shroff, American anchor for ESPNews since 2008
Ardeshir Darabshaw Shroff (1899–1965), Indian industrialist, banker and economist
Boman Shroff, Indian actor, stuntman, director, writer, producer
D. K. Shroff, Indian celebrity business manager
Esmayeel Shroff (born 1960), Indian film director and writer
Jackie Shroff (born 1957), Indian actor
Pervin Shroff, Indian scientist
Pesi Shroff (born 1965), Indian jockey
Sachin Shroff (born 1972), Indian actor
Sahil Shroff, Indian model and actor
Sunil Shroff, Indian urology and transplant surgeon
Sunita Shroff, British television presenter and actress
Tiger Shroff (born 1990), Indian model and actor
Zenobia Shroff, Indian-American actress

See also
 
 
 SARAF
 Sarraf
 Sharaf

References

Surnames of Indian origin
Indian surnames
Occupational surnames